Franklin station is a side platformed Sacramento RT light rail station in Sacramento, California, United States. The station was opened on August 24, 2015, and is operated by the Sacramento Regional Transit District. It is served by the Blue Line. The station is located on the north side of Cosumnes River Boulevard west of Franklin Boulevard in the South Sacramento neighborhood of Valley Hi. There is a 668-stall park and ride with a daily fee located at the station.

References

Sacramento Regional Transit light rail stations
Railway stations in the United States opened in 2015